Christopher Woodhouse may refer to:
Montague Woodhouse, 5th Baron Terrington, full name Christopher Montague Woodhouse, (1917–2001), Conservative MP
Christopher Woodhouse, 6th Baron Terrington (born 1946), urologist and son of the former

See also
Chris Woodhouse